Margaret Ruth Kidder (October 17, 1948 – May 13, 2018), known professionally as Margot Kidder, was a Canadian-American actress whose career spanned five decades. Her accolades include three Canadian Screen Awards and one Daytime Emmy Award. Though she appeared in an array of film and television roles, Kidder is most widely known for her performance as Lois Lane in the Superman film series, appearing in the first four films.

Born in Yellowknife to a Canadian mother and an American father, Kidder was raised in the Northwest Territories as well as several Canadian provinces. She began her acting career in the 1960s, appearing in low-budget Canadian films and television series, before landing a lead role in Quackser Fortune Has a Cousin in the Bronx (1970). She then played twins in Brian De Palma's cult thriller Sisters (1973), a sorority student in the slasher film Black Christmas (1974) and the titular character's girlfriend in the drama The Great Waldo Pepper (1975), opposite Robert Redford. In 1977, she was cast as Lois Lane in Richard Donner's Superman (1978), a role that established her as a mainstream actress. Her performance as Kathy Lutz in the blockbuster horror film The Amityville Horror (1979) gained her further mainstream exposure, after which she went on to reprise her role as Lois Lane in Superman II, III, and IV (1980–1987).

The 1990s were marked by significant health problems for Kidder: In 1990 she sustained serious injuries in a car accident that left her temporarily paralyzed, and she later had a highly publicized manic episode and nervous breakdown in 1996 stemming from bipolar disorder. By the 2000s she maintained steady work in independent films and television, with guest-starring roles in Smallville, Brothers & Sisters, Law & Order: Special Victims Unit and The L Word, and appeared in a 2002 Off-Broadway production of The Vagina Monologues. In 2015, she won a Daytime Emmy Award for her performance in the children's television series R.L. Stine's The Haunting Hour.

In 2005 Kidder became a naturalized U.S. citizen. She was an outspoken political, environmental and anti-war activist, and continued to participate in political and activist causes until her death. Kidder died on May 13, 2018, at her home in Livingston, Montana, aged 69, in what was later ruled a suicide by alcohol and drug overdose.

Early life 
Margaret Ruth Kidder, one of five children, was born on October 17, 1948, in Yellowknife, Northwest Territories, the daughter of Jocelyn Mary "Jill" (née Wilson), a history teacher, and Kendall Kidder, an explosives expert and engineer. Kidder was born in Yellowknife because of her father's employment, which required the family to live in remote locations. Her father subsequently served as the manager of the Yellowknife Telephone Company from 1948 to 1951. Her mother was Canadian, from British Columbia, while her father was an American, from New Mexico. She was of Welsh and English descent. She had one sister, Annie, who is a Canadian actress and executive director of the People for Education charity, and three brothers: John, Michael and Peter. Two of her siblings married notable Canadians: Annie marrying actor Eric Peterson, and John, politician Elizabeth May. Kidder's niece Janet Kidder is also an actress.
Recalling her childhood in northern Canada, Kidder said: "We didn't have movies in this little mining town. When I was 12 my mom took me to New York and I saw Bye Bye Birdie, with people singing and dancing, and that was it. I knew I had to go far away. I was clueless, but I [have done] okay." In addition to Yellowknife, she also spent some time growing up in Labrador City, Newfoundland and Labrador. Kidder became interested in politics from a young age, which she credited to debates her parents would have over the dinner table; her mother had socialist leanings, while her father was a conservative Republican.

Kidder had mental health issues from a young age, which stemmed from undiagnosed bipolar disorder. "I knew I was different, had these mind flights that other people didn't seem to have," she recalled. At age 14, she attempted suicide. Kidder found an outlet in acting as she felt she could "let my real self out... and no one would know it was me." "Nobody ever encouraged me to be an actress," she recalled. "It was taken as a joke ... As a teenager, I envisioned myself in every book I read. I wanted to be Henry Miller and Thomas Wolfe. I wanted to eat everything on the world's platter, but my eyes were bigger than my stomach." She attended multiple schools during her youth through her family's relocations, eventually graduating from Havergal College, a boarding school in Toronto, in 1966. In 1966, she found herself pregnant by her boyfriend, who arranged for an illegal abortion. The abortionist was located in a hotel room and filled Kidder's uterus with Lysol to terminate the pregnancy. After graduating from Havergal, Kidder relocated to Vancouver to attend the University of British Columbia, but dropped out after one year. She returned to Toronto, where she found work as a model.

Career

1968–1974: Early films and television 

Kidder made her film debut in a 49-minute film titled The Best Damn Fiddler from Calabogie to Kaladar (1968), a drama set in a Canadian logging community, which was produced by the Challenge for Change. Kidder's 1969 appearance in the episode "Does Anybody Here Know Denny?" on the Canadian drama series Corwin earned her a Canadian Film Award for "outstanding new talent."

Kidder's first major feature was the 1969 American film Gaily, Gaily, a period comedy starring Beau Bridges, in which she portrayed a prostitute. She subsequently appeared in a number of TV drama series for the CBC, including guest appearances on Wojeck, Adventures in Rainbow Country, and a semi-regular role as a young reporter on McQueen, and as a panelist on Mantrap which featured discussions centered on a feminist perspective. During the 1971–72 season, she co-starred as barmaid Ruth in Nichols, a James Garner–led Western, which aired 22 episodes on NBC.

During an August 3, 1970, interview on The Dick Cavett Show, Kidder stated that she was ambivalent toward having a film career, and was considering working as a film editor in the future. At this time, she had become an acquaintance of director Robert Altman, and served as an apprentice assisting him in editing Brewster McCloud (1970). She subsequently appeared in "Such Dust As Dreams Are Made On", the first pilot for Harry O which aired in March 1973. She was a guest star in a 1972 episode of the George Peppard detective series Banacek.

After moving to Los Angeles, Kidder was cast opposite Gene Wilder in Quackser Fortune Has a Cousin in the Bronx (1970) as an exchange student in Ireland who becomes the love interest of a poor horse manure collector in Dublin whom she almost runs over with her car. After filming in Ireland, Kidder relocated to New York City to further study acting. A year later, she returned to California, and was cast in the Brian De Palma film Sisters (1973), which gained notoriety for both director and Kidder, who as leading lady, portrayed conjoined twins, one of whom is a suspect in a brutal murder. Kidder had been in a relationship with De Palma at the time, and had been roommates with co-star Jennifer Salt in Los Angeles. Sisters went on to achieve critical recognition, being considered among the best American films of the decade by critic Robin Wood, as well as one of the most important films in Kidder's career by film critic G. Allen Johnson.

She then starred in the slasher film Black Christmas (1974), for which she won a Canadian Film Award for Best Actress; followed by a role as a prostitute in the Terrence Malick–scripted The Gravy Train (1974). She received another Canadian Film Award for Best Actress for her performance in the war drama A Quiet Day in Belfast (1974). Also in 1974, Kidder made her directorial debut with a 50-minute short film produced for the American Film Institute, titled Again. The film follows a woman who pastes photographs of her former lovers on her wall, continuously searching for "Mr. Right."

1975–1980: Superman, mainstream recognition 

Kidder had a central supporting role in the airplane-themed drama The Great Waldo Pepper (1975) opposite Robert Redford and Susan Sarandon, followed by a lead role in the psychological horror film The Reincarnation of Peter Proud, directed by J. Lee Thompson, in which she portrayed a woman about whom a college professor has recurring nightmares. Variety praised her performance in the latter film as "outstandingly rich." In the summer of 1975, Kidder was hired to direct a documentary short chronicling the making of The Missouri Breaks (1976), a Western film starring Marlon Brando and Jack Nicholson. "I was such a jerk," she recalled. "I mean, I thought they wanted a real documentary. So I filmed all the behind-the-scenes rows and arguments and shot footage of the vet shooting up the horses with tranquilizers so the actors would look as if they rode well. What an idiot I was. Then when they fired me, I realized what they'd wanted was a publicity film."

She subsequently co-starred with Peter Fonda in 92 in the Shade (also 1975), a drama directed by novelist Thomas McGuane, based on his own book. While filming, Kidder became romantically involved with McGuane, and in March 1975 relocated with him to Livingston, Montana. She subsequently became pregnant, and gave birth to their only child, daughter Maggie McGuane, on October 28, 1975. During this time, Kidder took a hiatus from acting, though she appeared in the March 9, 1975, edition of The American Sportsman, learning how to hang glide, and providing the narration, with a remote microphone recording her reactions in flight; the segment concluded with Kidder doing solos soaring amid the Wyoming Rockies. She was also photographed by Douglas Kirkland for the March 1975 issue of Playboy, accompanied by an article written by Kidder herself. Kidder and McGuane married on August 2, 1976, but the marriage ended in divorce on July 21, 1977. During the marriage, Kidder stated that her self-esteem had faltered significantly, and she found it difficult to maintain a career in film while residing in Montana.

Eager to return to acting, Kidder read for the character of Lois Lane in the 1978 superhero film Superman: The Movie, in the spring of 1977, only one month before principal photography was scheduled to begin. Kidder was subsequently flown to England for screen-tests. Upon meeting with director Richard Donner, Kidder tripped while walking into the room. Donner recalled: "I just fell in love with her. It was perfect, this clumsy [behavior]." She was ultimately cast in the role, which would become her most iconic. Filming lasted approximately eighteen months. Superman was released during Christmas 1978 and was a major commercial success, grossing $300 million worldwide. Kidder won a Saturn Award for Best Actress for her performance, which was deemed "most charming" by Vincent Canby in The New York Times.

After completing filming for Superman, Kidder starred as Kathy Lutz in the supernatural horror film The Amityville Horror (1979), which further cemented her status as one of Hollywood's leading ladies. The Amityville Horror was a major commercial success, grossing over $86 million in the United States, but it received mixed reviews from critics. Janet Maslin of The New York Times, though giving the film a mixed review, said Kidder "stubbornly remains the bright-eyed life of the party [in the film]." In retrospect, Kidder called the film "a piece of shit." The same year, Kidder hosted an episode of the American sketch comedy TV show Saturday Night Live. On August 25, 1979, she married actor John Heard, but the couple separated only six days into their marriage. Their divorce was finalized on December 26, 1980.

Kidder reprised her role as Lois Lane in Superman II (1980), though she publicly disagreed with the decision of producers Alexander Salkind and Ilya Salkind to replace Richard Donner as director. Superman II was also a box-office hit, grossing $108 million in the United States. Through her appearances in the Superman films, Kidder maintained a close friendship with her co-star Christopher Reeve, which lasted from 1978 until his death in 2004: "When you're strapped to someone hanging from the ceiling for months and months, you get pretty darned close," Kidder told CBS. "He was such a huge part of my life... He was complicated, very smart, really smart, and he knew he'd done something meaningful. He was very aware of that and very happy with that role." Also in 1980, she appeared in Paul Mazursky's romantic comedy Willie & Phil, playing one-third of a love triangle opposite Michael Ontkean and Ray Sharkey.

1981–1988: Career re-evaluation 
Kidder starred in the Canadian comedic road movie Heartaches (1981), portraying a free-spirited woman who helps an acquaintance raise her child. Vincent Canby of The New York Times noted: "Nothing happens in Heartaches that isn't telegraphed 15 minutes ahead of time, but Miss Kidder and Miss [Annie] Potts are good fun to watch, not because they convince you of the reality of their characters but because they handle their assignments with such unbridled, comic, actressy enthusiasm." She then starred opposite Richard Pryor in the comedy Some Kind of Hero (1982), about a Vietnam War veteran who attempts to re-assimilate into civilian life. While filming the picture, Kidder stated she "fell in love with Pryor in two seconds flat," and the two carried on a relationship during the production. Prior to this, Kidder was romantically linked to Canadian prime minister Pierre Trudeau in the early-1980s. In 1982, she appeared in a stage performance of Bus Stop, playing Cherie opposite Tim Matheson as Bo, which was broadcast on HBO.

It was reported that, as a result of Kidder's previous objection to Donner's directorial replacement for Superman II, her role in 1983's Superman III was notably small, consisting of 12 lines and less than five minutes of footage, though the producers have denied this in DVD commentaries. The same year Superman III was released, Kidder also starred as a court stenographer-cum-private eye named Mickey Raymond in the comedy Trenchcoat (1983). Critic Roger Ebert disliked the film, deeming it "one of the most tired, predictable, uninteresting movies in a long time." Also in 1983, Kidder produced and starred as Eliza Doolittle in a version of Pygmalion with Peter O'Toole for Showtime.

Kidder subsequently produced and starred in the French-Canadian period television film Louisiana (1984) as a plantation owner in the American South who returns from Paris to find her estate and holdings have been lost. Kidder began dating the film's director, Philippe de Broca, and the two married in France in 1983. Her marriage to de Broca lasted one year, ending in divorce in 1984. Kidder later characterized the marriage as "impulsive, I'm afraid. Not a little irresponsible. We just weren't meant to be married to each other." In 1984, she reunited with her former Nichols co-star, James Garner, in the Hollywood crime drama The Glitter Dome, and appeared in the drama Little Treasure for Columbia Tri-Star, with co-stars Ted Danson and Burt Lancaster, in which she played a distraught stripper looking for her bank robber-father's buried fortune.

In 1985, Kidder expressed ambivalence toward continuing her career, and was quoted as saying: "I don't feel comfortable as a performer and I'm a big turkey as a movie star." She would subsequently state that the quote was reported out of context, but conceded: "I am in a weird frame of mind at the moment. I know acting is not going to be enough for me for the rest of my life. This business is very hard on women at a certain age, and I never want to end up just having to accept what's offered me. So I am anxious to direct, to have options." In 1986, she was selected as the English narrator for the Japanese animated series The Wonderful Wizard of Oz. Kidder subsequently reprised her Lois Lane role in Superman IV: The Quest for Peace (1987), which she filmed in 1986. Body of Evidence (1988), a CBS Movie of the Week, cast Kidder as a nurse who is suspicious that her medical pathologist second husband is a serial killer.

1990–1999: Mental health struggles 
In the fall of 1990, Kidder appeared as a singer who becomes a murder victim in the Canadian television film White Room (1990). In December that year, Kidder was seriously injured in a car accident on the set of the television series Nancy Drew and Daughter which left her partially paralyzed as a result of spinal injury. She was unable to work for two years, causing her financial difficulties, resulting in debts of over $800,000. Kidder attempted to sue the Canadian producer, Nelvana, for $1 million in damages but did not receive a settlement, and her launching of the suit rendered her ineligible for Canadian workers' compensation. Kidder returned to the screen with an uncredited cameo appearance in the comedy film Delirious (1991), appearing as a woman in a washroom. This was followed by a role as a psychic in To Catch a Killer (1992), a Canadian television thriller film based on the crimes of John Wayne Gacy. She had several small roles in 1994, including in the Disney Channel film Windrunner, as well as another uncredited appearance in Maverick. She also played a bartender at the Broken Skull Tavern in Under a Killing Moon, an IBM PC adventure game.

Kidder's mental health was declining during this period; she had received a diagnosis of bipolar disorder in 1988, which she rejected at the time, and refused the recommended lithium treatment. In April 1996, she experienced a widely publicized manic episode in Los Angeles. At the time, Kidder had been working on an autobiography when her laptop computer became infected with a virus, which caused it to crash and her to lose three years' worth of drafts. Kidder flew to California to have the computer examined by a data retrieval company, who ultimately was unable to retrieve the files. She entered a manic state and disappeared for four days. She was later found by a homeowner in the backyard of a Glendale residence, and was taken by the Los Angeles Police Department to Olive View–UCLA Medical Center in a distressed state, the caps on her teeth having been knocked out during a rape attempt. She was subsequently placed in psychiatric care. While convalescing from the incident in Vancouver, Kidder said she finally "was able to accept the diagnosis." She would later speak openly about her treatment of the disorder via orthomolecular medicine.

Kidder returned to film with a lead role in the independent comedy-drama Never Met Picasso (1997), portraying an actress living with her gay adult son (portrayed by Alexis Arquette) who is attempting to sort his life out. Kevin Thomas of the Los Angeles Times wrote that "Arquette and Kidder [were] given the chance to come across as quite appealing" in their roles. She next appeared in the slasher film The Clown at Midnight (1998), opposite Christopher Plummer, and alongside Lynn Redgrave and James Earl Jones in the comedy The Annihilation of Fish (1999), playing the landlady of an interracial couple. Critic Todd McCarthy in Variety referred to the film as a "would-be charmer" and "a drear moment in the careers of all concerned."

2000–2018: Independent films, television 

In 2000, Kidder played Eileen Canboro in Apocalypse III: Tribulation, a Christian film dealing with Christian eschatology and the rapture. Kidder stated afterwards that she did not realize until she was on the set that the movie was serious. Also that year she appeared in three episodes of Peter Benchley's Amazon, playing a striking role as an insane Canadian woman bent on domination of all the local tribes. In 2001, she played the abusive mother of a serial killer in "Pique", an episode of Law & Order: Special Victims Unit. In 2002, she appeared alongside Crispin Glover and Vanessa Redgrave in the film adaptation of Crime and Punishment.

Kidder appeared off-Broadway in The Vagina Monologues in December 2002, and toured with the show for two years. After this, she appeared on Robson Arms, a Canadian sitcom set in an apartment block in Vancouver's west end. She played a quirky neighbor of the main cast members. She also had a cameo in Rich Hall's Election Special on BBC Four. In 2006, Kidder played Jenny Schecter's mother Sandy Ziskin on The L Word; her character was a repressed Jewish woman coming to terms with her daughter's sexuality. In 2007, Kidder began appearing on the television series Brothers and Sisters, playing Emily Craft. In 2004, Kidder briefly returned to the Superman franchise in two episodes of the television series Smallville, as Bridgette Crosby, an emissary of Dr. Swann (played by her Superman co-star, Christopher Reeve).

Kidder became a United States citizen on August 17, 2005, in Butte, Montana, and settled in Livingston. She said that she decided to become an American citizen to participate in the voting process, to continue her protests against U.S. intervention in Iraq, and to be free of worries about being deported.

In 2008, she portrayed an embattled guidance counselor in the gay-themed mystery film On the Other Hand, Death, as well as a supporting role as Laurie Strode's therapist, in Rob Zombie's Halloween II (2009). In an interview with the LGBT publication The Advocate, Kidder discussed her later career choices:

In 2015, Kidder won an Emmy Award for Outstanding Performer in Children's Programming for her performance in R.L. Stine's The Haunting Hour.

Activism and politics 
Kidder was a longtime supporter of the U.S. Democratic party and voiced her support for liberal causes throughout her career. She actively supported Jesse Jackson's bid for the Democratic nomination in the 1984 United States presidential election. In the early 1990s, during the first Gulf War, Kidder was branded a "Baghdad Betty" and subjected to abuse for her remarks questioning the war. In a piece called "Confessions of 'Baghdad Betty'", styled as a letter to her mother and printed in The Nation, Kidder responded by explaining and defending her statements.

In 2008, Kidder was a volunteer at the Barack Obama campaign headquarters in Livingston, Montana.

As of November 2009, Kidder was the Montana State Coordinator for Progressive Democrats of America. The organization's website carried her article "Ax Max", in which she criticized Max Baucus, Montana's Democratic senator. She also contributed articles to CounterPunch, a left-wing magazine, beginning in 2009. On August 22, 2015, she was named the host of a dinner event by the Yellowstone County Democrats in Billings, Montana, called "Billings for Bernie" in support of Bernie Sanders' presidential primary bid. In a CounterPunch article expressing her reaction to the 2016 Democratic National Convention, she wrote, "I am not an American tonight... I reject the words I voiced at my citizenship ceremony."

In addition to her campaigning in the United States, Kidder expressed support for liberal causes in Canada. In 2011, she supported her brother, John Kidder, in British Columbia, who was running to be a member of Canada's Parliament for the Liberal Party:

Throughout her life, Kidder was also invested in efforts protesting for environmental and anti-nuclear causes. On August 23, 2011, Kidder, Tantoo Cardinal, and dozens of others were arrested while protesting in Washington, D.C., against the proposed extension of the Keystone Pipeline. In 2012, she appeared in a video for Stop the Frack Attack, an environmental organization working toward regulating hydraulic fracturing ("fracking") practices. When discussing sustainable energy, Kidder said: "The first thing people have to start facing, contrary to the advertising fed to us by oil and gas companies, is that environmentalism and economic stability go hand-in-hand on any long term basis." Kidder spent the winter of 2016–2017 residing in a tent at the Standing Rock Reservation in North Dakota, protesting the Dakota Access Pipeline.

In addition to environmental causes, Kidder was a vocal supporter of LGBT rights, and in 2003 hosted benefits at a gay and lesbian health center in Boston, Massachusetts. Following her publicized nervous breakdown in 1996, she also spoke outwardly about her struggles with mental health and her bipolar disorder diagnosis. In 2001, she was awarded the Courage in Mental Health Award from the California Women's Mental Health Policy Council for her public dialogue on mental illness.

Death 

Kidder died on May 13, 2018, at her house in Livingston, Montana, at the age of 69. Kidder's death was ruled a suicide by overdose. Kidder had been scheduled to appear at the Motor City Comic Con event in Novi, Michigan later that week.  

Kidder's friends have related that she had had poor health in recent years, particularly following her lengthy stay at the Standing Rock protest camp in 2016, often enduring frigid temperatures. DC Comics stated on its Twitter feed: "Thank you for being the Lois Lane so many of us grew up with. RIP, Margot Kidder." After her death, director Ted Geoghegan, who knew the actress, stated:

Kidder was cremated, and her ashes were scattered by her brother John in childhood-favorite locations in Canada, as well as in Montana, amongst lilies often eaten by grizzly bears, partially fulfilling Kidder's wish to "have her body just left out there for the bears."

Notes

Citations

General sources

External links 

 
 
 Article: From paranoid delusions to orthomolecular medicine
 Canadian Film Encyclopedia
 The Best Damn Fiddler from Calabogie to Kaladar
 Margot Kidder (Aveleyman)
 Brodesser-Akner, Taffy. "Margot Kidder," New York Times, December 27, 2018.

1948 births
2018 deaths
2018 suicides
Actresses from Montana
Actresses from the Northwest Territories
American anti–nuclear weapons activists
American atheists
American people of Canadian descent
American people of English descent
American people of Welsh descent
American film actresses
American environmentalists
American women environmentalists
American social democrats
American television actresses
American voice actresses
Canadian atheists
Canadian emigrants to the United States
Canadian environmentalists
Canadian women environmentalists
Canadian film actresses
Canadian people of American descent
Canadian people of English descent
Canadian people of Welsh descent
Canadian television actresses
Canadian voice actresses
Best Actress Genie and Canadian Screen Award winners
Daytime Emmy Award winners
Drug-related suicides in Montana
Female suicides
Canadian LGBT rights activists
American LGBT rights activists
Montana Democrats
People from Livingston, Montana
People from Yellowknife
People with bipolar disorder
20th-century American actresses
21st-century American actresses
20th-century Canadian actresses
21st-century Canadian actresses
Canadian Film Centre alumni
Havergal College alumni
Naturalized citizens of the United States
Women civil rights activists
Alcohol-related deaths in Montana